Urushibara nickel is a nickel based hydrogenation catalyst, named after Yoshiyuki Urushibara.

History
It was discovered by Yoshiyuki Urushibara in 1951, while doing research on the reduction of estrone to estradiol.

Preparation
First nickel is precipitated in metallic form by reacting a solution of a nickel salt with an excess of zinc. This precipitated nickel contains relatively large amounts of zinc and zinc oxide. Then the catalyst is activated by digesting with either base or acid. There are different designations for differently prepared Urushibara nickel catalysts. The most common is U-Ni-A and U-Ni-B. U-Ni-A is prepared by digesting the precipitated nickel with an acid such as acetic acid. U-Ni-B is prepared by digesting with a base such as sodium hydroxide. After the digestion with acid most of the zinc and zinc oxide is dissolved from the catalyst, while after digestion with base it still contains considerable amounts of zinc and zinc oxide. It is also possible to precipitate the nickel using aluminium or magnesium.

Properties
Urushibara nickel is not pyrophoric. It can be used for most hydrogenations where W-7 grade Raney nickel can be used.

Variations
Cobalt or iron can substitute for nickel to form different hydrogenation catalysts with different properties, these catalysts are respectively termed Urushibara cobalt and Urushibara iron. As a hydrogenation catalyst, Urushibara cobalt is used for nitrile reduction where it serves as a superior catalyst for the production of primary amines. Urushibara iron is limited as a catalyst due to its relatively low activity toward most functional groups, however; it does finds some use in the partial hydrogenation of alkynes to alkenes.

See also
Nickel boride catalyst
Nickel(II) oxide
Cobalt boride
Lindlar catalyst
Adams's catalyst
Molybdenum disulfide

References

Hydrogenation catalysts
Nickel alloys
Zinc alloys